For the wafer snack "oplatky", see Spa wafer. 

 
Oplatky is a 1955 Czechoslovak film. The film starred Josef Kemr.

References

1955 films
Czechoslovak short films
1950s Czech-language films
Czech anthology films
1950s Czech films
Czech short films